Boca do Monte ("mouth of the hill") is a bairro in the District of Boca do Monte in the municipality of Santa Maria, in the Brazilian state of Rio Grande do Sul. It is located in west Santa Maria.

Villages 
The bairro contains the following villages:Boca do Monte, Cabeceira do Raimundo, Caixa d'Água, Canabarro, Cezarpina, Colônia Pedro Stok, Corredor dos Pivetas, Durasnal, Estação Experimental de Silvicultura, Estância Velha, Filipinho, Lajeadinho, Parada Link, Passo da Ferreira, Picada dos Bastos, Quebra Dente, Quilombo das Vassouras, Rincão do Barroso, Rincão dos Flores, Santo Antônio, Vila Boca do Monte, Vila Esmeralda.

References 

Bairros of Santa Maria, Rio Grande do Sul